Trinetra is a 1991 Indian Hindi-language action film directed by Harry Baweja. The film stars Mithun Chakraborty, Shilpa Shirodkar, Deepa Sahi in lead roles, with Dharmendra in a special appearance.

Plot
Trinetra is the story of the revenge of a son, who lost his honest father, to a group of evil minds. It is the story of a son's infinite love for his mother, who lost her husband. It is the story of a son's revenge on his father's killers.

Raja is an aspiring singer and gets a chance to sing in Dubai through Mr. Singhania. He informs his pregnant wife, Seema, and they look forward to a more prosperous life. Before that could happen, Raja finds out that Singhania is going to use him to carry drugs in his suitcase, he objects to this and is brutally killed in the presence of his wife. His wife flees the assailants and gives birth to a baby boy near the temple of Bhagwan Shri Shankar and names the boy Shiva. Unmarried and childless, Maria Fernandes sees the child and an apparently dead Seema and takes the child.

But Seema is still alive and is angered at being separated from her son. She swears to avenge Raja's death and sets about to kill the assailants one by one. She manages to kill one of them, but before she could proceed on with her gruesome task, she is arrested by the police and sentenced to jail for several years. How will Seema avenge the death of Raja? Will she escape from prison, or wait until she is withered and old after the end of her sentence?

Cast
Mithun Chakraborty as Shiva / Tony Fernandes
Shilpa Shirodkar as Mona
Deepa Sahi as Seema
Kader Khan as Shyam
Shakti Kapoor as Ghanshyam
Anupam Kher as  Father Patrick
Gulshan Grover as Gulshan
Amrish Puri as Singhania
Laxmikant Berde as Ajit / Amar / Akbar / Anthony (Quadruple Role)
Anjana Mumtaz as Maria
Shammi as Ajit's Mother
Guddi Maruti as Mona's Friend
Bharat Kapoor as Bhavishyavani
Viju Khote as Roshanlal
Mukri as Fight Promoter
Chandrashekhar as Jailor
Mac Mohan as Mac
Mahesh Anand as Franco
Dan Dhanoa as Singhania's Henchman
Manik Irani as Singhania's Goon
Dharmendra as Raja (Special Appearance)

Soundtrack
Anand–Milind composed the music and Sameer penned the lyrics. The song "Main Tujhe Chhodke" sung by Kumar Sanu became very popular during the release of the film. Singers are Kumar Sanu, Amit Kumar, S. P. Balasubrahmanyam, Kavita Krishnamurthy, Sapna Mukherjee and Jolly Mukherjee.

External links
 

1991 films
1990s Hindi-language films
Films scored by Anand–Milind
Films directed by Harry Baweja